Barry Sonshine (1 February 1948 – 13 December 2020) was a Canadian equestrian. He competed in two events at the 1968 Summer Olympics.

References

External links
 

1948 births
2020 deaths
Canadian male equestrians
Olympic equestrians of Canada
Equestrians at the 1968 Summer Olympics
Sportspeople from Toronto